Hemidactylus romeshkanicus is a species of gecko. It is endemic to Iran.

References

Hemidactylus
Reptiles described in 2011
Geckos of Iran
Endemic fauna of Iran